Flann ua Clerigh was King of Uí Fiachrach Aidhne, .

References
 Irish Kings and High-Kings, Francis John Byrne (2001), Dublin: Four Courts Press, 
 CELT: Corpus of Electronic Texts at University College Cork

People from County Galway
10th-century Irish monarchs